Pray for You may refer to:

"Pray for You" (Jaron and the Long Road to Love song)
"Pray for You" (The Swon Brothers song)
"Pray for You", by Sara Evans from Greatest Hits